Eugenia Caruso is an Italian actress and screenwriter.

Early life
Caruso was born in Rome and completed her studies in the United Kingdom at East 15 Acting School.

Career
Caruso played the character of Mrs Santorelli in the television series adaptation of The Alienist. She also appeared in the comedy series Avenue 5.

Caruso appeared in the 2020 film The Witches, an adaptation of Roald Dahl's book of the same name.

Filmography 
 Actress
 2006 : The Silver Rope (short film) : Anne
 2006 : Nati ieri (Italian TV series) : Puerpera 
 2008 : I demoni di San Pietroburgo : Lab Student
 2011 : Fleeting Visit (court métrage)
 2012 : Berberian Sound Studio : Claudia 
 2012 : Il filo d'Arianna (short film) : Sara
 2014 : The Duke of Burgundy : Dr. Fraxini / screaming voice
 2015 : Youth : Puritan Woman
 2015 : Soap (short film) : Sophia
 2015 : Chasing Robert Barker : Nadia
 2016 : Country of Hotels : Louisa / Beverly
 2016 : Checkmate (short film); Screenwriter
 2016 : Eclair : Anna 
 2018 : The Alienist : Mrs Santorelli
 2020 : Avenue 5 (TV series) (Episodes: "This Is Physically Hurting Me"; "I Was Flying") : Verity
 2020 : The Witches

Radio 
2014 : Road to Venice (BBC4)

2015 The Stone Tape (BBC R4)

2015: The Len Continuum (BBC4)

Performances 
2017, Stage, Natalie Stampanatto, The Verdict Middleground Theatre Company, Michael Lunney

2016, Stage, Nurse, Redefining Juliet, Barbican, Rae McKen

2011–2014, Stage, Various, HURRIED STEPS, New Shoes at THE FINBOROUGHand TOUR NICOLETTE KAY

2007, Stage, Katalijne, Truckstop, Eastern Angles  and Company of Angels, Unicorn, Hampstead Theatre, Christopher Rolls

Awards and nominations 
Won Best actress award jointly with Janet Bamford at The Stage Awards for Acting Excellence 2007

References 
Mandy Actors Profile - https://actors.mandy.com/uk/actor/profile/eugenia-caruso

English actresses
English screenwriters
Living people
Year of birth missing (living people)
Italian actresses
Italian screenwriters